IIUI Schools, is a school system launched by International Islamic University, Islamabad in 2010 on occasion of its Silver Jubilee (1985–2010). The IIUI Schools, also known as, International Islamic University Schools, are the first school system established by a university in Pakistan, aimed to assist in creating high achievers with an advanced level of independent thinking, impeccable character and remarkable confidence in line with the teachings and norms taught by Islam.

General Information

The School Grades 
Playgroup to O/A-levels and Matric to HSSC
IIUI Schools provide education from Playgroup to GCE O/A-levels and Matric to HSSC. Phalia Campus is now offering classes from Playgroup to O/A-levels, and will gradually extend to A-levels  in the coming years.

Academic Year 
The school year is divided into two terms:
First term: August to December
Second term: January to June

Curriculum 
IIUI Schools follow an in-house curriculum which is designed to prepare students for IGCSE and GCE O/A-levels, and is based on international standards and core Islamic values. The IIUI Schools Curriculum focuses on practical and interactive learning programs relying not only on total learning within the classroom but also based on outside academic activities such as presentations, conferences, seminars and meetings for students of grade 1 onward.

Subjects 

The school offers following subjects, at different levels.

Facilities 
 Learning Centers
 ICT Lab
 Library
 Playground
 Tuck shop
 Transport

Campuses of IIUI Schools 
Some of the existing and upcoming campuses of IIUI Schools are:,
 Abbotabad Campus
 Attock Campus
 Adyala Campus, Rawalpindi 
 Scheme III Chaklala Campus, Rawalpindi 
 Bhalwal Campus
 Chakwal City Campus
 Chak Shahzad Campus Islamabad.
 Dera Ghazi Khan Campus
 D. I. Khan Campus
 Canal Road Campus, Faisalabad
 Civil Lines Campus, Faisalabad
 Ali Pur Chattha Campus, Gujranwala
 Gujar Khan Campus
 Gujranwala City, Campus
 Gujranwala Cantt, Campus
 Gujrat City Campus
 Hyderabad Campus
 Bhara Kahu Campus, Islamabad
 Model Town Humak Campus, Islamabad
 Shehzad Town Campus, Islamabad
 I-8 Sector Campus, Islamabad
 Jhelum Campus
 Joher Abad Campus
 Khyber Campus, Peshawar
 Larkana campus (wakeel colony Larkana 0744752052 )
 Kohat Campus
 Township Campus Lahore
 Shabzazar Campus, Lahore
 Mansehra City Campus
 Mirpur City Campus
 Mardan City Campus
 Multan City Campus
 Narowal City Campus
 Nowshera Campus
 Okara Campus
 Phalia Campus, Mandi Bahauddin
 Warsak Road Campus, Peshawar
 Khayaban-e-Sirsyed Campus, Rawalpindi
 Gulrez Housing Scheme Campus, Rawalpindi
 Gulzar-e-Quaid Campus, Rawalpindi
 Satellite Town Campus, Rawalpindi
 Tulsa Road Campus, Rawalpindi
 Westridge Campus, Rawalpindi
  Quaid-e-Azam Colony Campus, Quaid-e-Azam Colony, Chakri Road, Rawalpindi
 Rahim Yar Khan Campus
 Sahiwal Campus
 Sargodha City Campus
 Shakargarh Campus
 Sialkot City Campus
 Swabi Campus
 Swat Campus
 Talagang City Campus
 Wah Cantt Campus
 Wazirabad Campus
 Patoki Campus
 Renalakhurd Campus
 IIUI Schools, Haripur Campus   Campus Address: Abdullah Street, Shakar Shah Road.

References

External links 
 IIUI Schools (www.iius.edu.pk)

Phalia
International Islamic University, Islamabad
School systems in Pakistan
2011 establishments in Pakistan
Salafism in Pakistan
Islamic schools in Pakistan